Shavvaz (also Romanized as Shavvāz, and Shovāz, and Shavāz; also known as Shāh Āvaz and Shāh ‘Evaz) is a village in Nasrabad Rural District, in the Central District of Taft County, Yazd Province, Iran. At the 2006 census, its population was 157, in 70 families.

References 

Populated places in Taft County